Rahib Məmmədov (born 22 July 1992 in Baku) is an Azerbaijani hurdler.

His personal best is of 14.06 (2018). He won the 110 m hurdles at 2011 European Team Championships.
His personal best of 60 m hurdles indoor is the national record.

References

External links 
IAAF Athlete’s profile

Azerbaijani male athletes
1992 births
Living people
European Games competitors for Azerbaijan
Athletes (track and field) at the 2015 European Games
Islamic Solidarity Games competitors for Azerbaijan
21st-century Azerbaijani people